Chinatown at Midnight is a 1949 film noir crime film directed by Seymour Friedman and starring Hurd Hatfield.

Plot
After a jade vase is mentioned to him by Lisa Marcel, an interior designer, Clifford Ward steals it from a Chinatown shop. He shoots and kills shopkeeper Joe Wong, who triggered the burglar alarm, and when employee Betty Chang telephones for help, Ward shoots her as well.

Ward, fluent in Chinese, speaks to the police on the phone. Telephone operator Hazel Fong becomes the only hope police have of identifying the voice. Lisa sees a photo of the stolen vase in the newspaper and immediately suspects Ward, who then adds her to his murder victims. When he falls ill and phones a neighborhood pharmacy, the call is once again placed by Hazel, who recognizes his voice. Ward attempts to flee, but the police gun him down.

Cast
 Hurd Hatfield	 as Clifford Ward
 Jean Willes as Alice
 Tom Powers as Capt. Howard Brown
 Ray Walker as 	Sam Costa
 Charles Russell	 as 	Fred Morgan
 Jacqueline deWit as Lisa Marcel (as Jacqueline DeWit)
 Maylia	 as Hazel Fong
 Ross Elliott	 as 	Eddie Marsh

Plot
The SF Police Department pursues a serial killer on the loose in San Francisco's Chinatown.

Preservation status
In 2014, a pristine 35mm print of the film was struck from the Columbia Pictures archives and subsequently exhibited at the Museum of Modern Art in New York City.

External links
Chinatown at Midnight at IMDB

Columbia Pictures films
1949 crime drama films
Films set in San Francisco
1949 films
American crime drama films
Films directed by Seymour Friedman
American black-and-white films
1940s English-language films
1940s American films